Richard Rader (born June 10, 1959) is an equestrian who represents the United States Virgin Islands. He competed in the individual eventing at the 1984 Summer Olympics.

References

External links
 

1959 births
Living people
United States Virgin Islands male equestrians
Olympic equestrians of the United States Virgin Islands
Equestrians at the 1984 Summer Olympics
Place of birth missing (living people)